Maria Doroteia Joaquina de Seixas Brandão (1767–1853), also called Marília, was a Brazilian heroine. She is famous for her participation in the failed Inconfidência Mineira for Brazilian independence from Portugal in 1789. She is also known for her engagement to Neoclassical poet Tomás António Gonzaga and his Marília de Dirceu, in which he immortalized her as the object of his love.

While Gonzaga extolled Marília's physical beauty at length, her younger first cousin, the poet Beatriz Francisca de Assis Brandão, tells us Marília was also a lively, quick-witted, and well-spoken person who tended toward sarcasm.

She has been the subject of a TV series and a film and have been featured on a stamp.

References

 SCHUMAHER, Maria Aparecida. Dicionário mulheres do Brasil: De 1500 até a atualidade. Rio de Janeiro: Editora Zahar, 2000. Pág. 421.

1767 births
1853 deaths
18th-century Brazilian people
People from Ouro Preto
18th-century Brazilian women